Miezan Edoukou (born April 5, 1967) is an Ivorian sprint canoer who competed in the mid-1990s. At the 1996 Summer Olympics in Atlanta, he was eliminated in the semifinals of the K-1 1000 m event.

External links
Sports-Reference.com profile

1967 births
Canoeists at the 1996 Summer Olympics
Ivorian male canoeists
Living people
Olympic canoeists of Ivory Coast